Neolissochilus hexagonolepis (common name: copper mahseer or chocolate mahseer
) is a species of cyprinid in the genus Neolissochilus. It inhabits India, Bangladesh, Nepal, Myanmar, Thailand, Malaysia, Indonesia, China, Bhutan, Pakistan and Vietnam.

In 2021, the Indian state of Sikkim declared Copper Mahseer, locally called 'Katley' as the State fish.

Distribution
The fish is found in different altitudes of the state of Sikkim, mainly in the Teesta and Rangit rivers and their tributaries.

Endangered Status
In  1992, ICAR-National Bureau of Fish Genetic Resources, Lucknow categorized the fish as an endangered specie. In 2014,  IUCN, categorized it as an endangered specie.

References

Cyprinidae
Cyprinid fish of Asia
Freshwater fish of India
Fish of Bangladesh
Fish of Nepal
Fish of Myanmar
Fish of Thailand
Fish of Malaysia
Fish of Indonesia
Freshwater fish of China
Fish of Bhutan
Fish of Pakistan
Fish of Vietnam